Cell Walk for Celeste is an album by Cecil Taylor recorded for the Candid label in January 1961 but not released until 1988. The album features performances by Taylor with Archie Shepp, Buell Neidlinger and Denis Charles. Additional recordings from these sessions were released on New York City R&B in 1971 and Jumpin' Punkins in 1987.

Reception

An AllMusic review states: "these Cecil Taylor small group arrangements find the pianist at an intriguing stage of his musical development, encompassing the traditional post-bop jazz of 'Jumpin' Punkins'..., and the more radical, yet still structured approach of the title track. Accompanied by an all-star lineup... Taylor's playing is like aural modern ballet--fractured, flowing, and lyrical."

Track listing 
All compositions by Cecil Tayor except as indicated
 "Cell Walk for Celeste" [Take 1] - 11:32  
 "Davis" [Take 1] (Buell Neidlinger) - 3:12  
 "Section C" [Take 1] - 10:24  
 "Jumpin' Punkins" [Take 4] (Mercer Ellington) - 8:20  
 "Jumpin' Punkins" [Take 5] (Ellington) - 8:20  
 "Davis" [Take 3] - 5:20  
 "Cell Walk for Celeste" [Take 3] - 9:51  
 Recorded Nola's Penthouse Sound Studios, NYC, January 9 & 10, 1961

Personnel 
 Cecil Taylor - piano
 Archie Shepp - tenor saxophone
 Buell Neidlinger - bass
 Denis Charles - drums

Tracks 4,5 also includes:

Billy Higgins - drums
Clark Terry - trumpet
Roswell Rudd - trombone
Steve Lacy - soprano saxophone
Charles Davis - baritone saxophone

References 

1961 albums
Cecil Taylor albums
Candid Records albums